Gaudêncio Machado Ramos Airport , informally known as Alegrete Novo Airport,  is the airport serving Alegrete, Brazil.

History
The airport was built as a replacement to an older facility located closer to downtown which was then closed.

Airlines and destinations

Access

See also

List of airports in Brazil

References

External links

Airports in Rio Grande do Sul